Sriram Balaji and Vishnu Vardhan were the defending champions but chose not to defend their title.

Gong Maoxin and Zhang Ze won the title after defeating Mikhail Elgin and Yaraslav Shyla 6–4, 6–4 in the final.

Seeds

Draw

References
 Main Draw

Chengdu Challenger - Doubles
2018 Doubles